The 1st constituency of the Hautes-Pyrénées (French: Première circonscription des Hautes-Pyrénées) is a French legislative constituency in the Hautes-Pyrénées département. Like the other 576 French constituencies, it elects one MP using a two round electoral system.

Description

The 1st constituency of Hautes-Pyrénées covers the east of the department including part of Tarbes, the rest being in Hautes-Pyrénées's 2nd constituency.

The constituency was historically generally supportive of Socialist Party candidates with the exceptions of 1993 until 2017. In 2017 the incumbent PS candidate came third in the first round of voting behind both En Marche!  and the left-wing La France Insoumise.
In 2022, the incumbent En Marche! deputy was defeated by Sylvie Ferrer of La France Insoumise.

Assembly Members

Election results

2022

 
 
 
 
 
 
 
 
 
|-
| colspan="8" bgcolor="#E9E9E9"|
|-
 
 

 
 
 
 
 

* PS dissident

2017

|- style="background-color:#E9E9E9;text-align:center;"
! colspan="2" rowspan="2" style="text-align:left;" | Candidate
! rowspan="2" colspan="2" style="text-align:left;" | Party
! colspan="2" | 1st round
! colspan="2" | 2nd round
|- style="background-color:#E9E9E9;text-align:center;"
! width="75" | Votes
! width="30" | %
! width="75" | Votes
! width="30" | %
|-
| style="background-color:" |
| style="text-align:left;" | Jean-Bernard Sempastous
| style="text-align:left;" | La République En Marche!
| LREM
| 
| 43.15
| 
| 58.86
|-
| style="background-color:" |
| style="text-align:left;" | Sylvie Ferrer
| style="text-align:left;" | La France Insoumise
| FI
| 
| 15.43
| 
| 41.14
|-
| style="background-color:" |
| style="text-align:left;" | Jean Galvany
| style="text-align:left;" | Socialist Party
| PS
| 
| 14.61
| colspan="2" style="text-align:left;" |
|-
| style="background-color:" |
| style="text-align:left;" | Geneviève Comont
| style="text-align:left;" | National Front
| FN
| 
| 10.84
| colspan="2" style="text-align:left;" |
|-
| style="background-color:" |
| style="text-align:left;" | Philippe Lacoume
| style="text-align:left;" | Communist Party
| PCF
| 
| 4.20
| colspan="2" style="text-align:left;" |
|-
| style="background-color:" |
| style="text-align:left;" | Henri Lourdou
| style="text-align:left;" | Ecologist
| ECO
| 
| 3.37
| colspan="2" style="text-align:left;" |
|-
| style="background-color:" |
| style="text-align:left;" | Jean-Bernard Achard
| style="text-align:left;" | Miscellaneous Right
| DVD
| 
| 3.04
| colspan="2" style="text-align:left;" |
|-
| style="background-color:" |
| style="text-align:left;" | Laurent Verdoux
| style="text-align:left;" | Independent
| DIV
| 
| 1.34
| colspan="2" style="text-align:left;" |
|-
| style="background-color:" |
| style="text-align:left;" | Habib Labed
| style="text-align:left;" | Debout la France
| DLF
| 
| 1.24
| colspan="2" style="text-align:left;" |
|-
| style="background-color:" |
| style="text-align:left;" | Quentin Caulliez
| style="text-align:left;" | Independent
| DIV
| 
| 0.92
| colspan="2" style="text-align:left;" |
|-
| style="background-color:" |
| style="text-align:left;" | Maria Saez
| style="text-align:left;" | Far Left
| EXG
| 
| 0.77
| colspan="2" style="text-align:left;" |
|-
| style="background-color:" |
| style="text-align:left;" | Véronique Carrere
| style="text-align:left;" | Miscellaneous Left
| DVG
| 
| 0.63
| colspan="2" style="text-align:left;" |
|-
| style="background-color:" |
| style="text-align:left;" | Raphaël Isla
| style="text-align:left;" | Independent
| DIV
| 
| 0.46
| colspan="2" style="text-align:left;" |
|-
| style="background-color:" |
| style="text-align:left;" | Thierry Giron
| style="text-align:left;" | Independent
| DIV
| 
| 0.00
| colspan="2" style="text-align:left;" |
|-
| colspan="8" style="background-color:#E9E9E9;"|
|- style="font-weight:bold"
| colspan="4" style="text-align:left;" | Total
| 
| 100%
| 
| 100%
|-
| colspan="8" style="background-color:#E9E9E9;"|
|-
| colspan="4" style="text-align:left;" | Registered voters
| 
| style="background-color:#E9E9E9;"|
| 
| style="background-color:#E9E9E9;"|
|-
| colspan="4" style="text-align:left;" | Blank/Void ballots
| 
| 3.41%
| 
| 9.10%
|-
| colspan="4" style="text-align:left;" | Turnout
| 
| 52.81%
| 
| 48.75%
|-
| colspan="4" style="text-align:left;" | Abstentions
| 
| 47.19%
| 
| 51.25%
|-
| colspan="8" style="background-color:#E9E9E9;"|
|- style="font-weight:bold"
| colspan="6" style="text-align:left;" | Result
| colspan="2" style="background-color:" | REM GAIN FROM PS
|}

2012

|- style="background-color:#E9E9E9;text-align:center;"
! colspan="2" rowspan="2" style="text-align:left;" | Candidate
! rowspan="2" colspan="2" style="text-align:left;" | Party
! colspan="2" | 1st round
! colspan="2" | 2nd round
|- style="background-color:#E9E9E9;text-align:center;"
! width="75" | Votes
! width="30" | %
! width="75" | Votes
! width="30" | %
|-
| style="background-color:" |
| style="text-align:left;" | Jean Glavany
| style="text-align:left;" | Socialist Party
| PS
| 
| 47.73
| 
| 66.91
|-
| style="background-color:" |
| style="text-align:left;" | Gérard Tremege
| style="text-align:left;" | Radical Party
| PRV
| 
| 26.30
| 
| 33.09
|-
| style="background-color:" |
| style="text-align:left;" | Claude Martin
| style="text-align:left;" | Left Front
| FG
| 
| 10.86
| colspan="2" style="text-align:left;" |
|-
| style="background-color:" |
| style="text-align:left;" | Alexandre Goessens
| style="text-align:left;" | National Front
| FN
| 
| 7.31
| colspan="2" style="text-align:left;" |
|-
| style="background-color:" |
| style="text-align:left;" | Jean-Marc Luce
| style="text-align:left;" | Europe Ecology – The Greens
| EELV
| 
| 3.85
| colspan="2" style="text-align:left;" |
|-
| style="background-color:" |
| style="text-align:left;" | Denis Tajan
| style="text-align:left;" | The Centre for France
| CEN
| 
| 2.12
| colspan="2" style="text-align:left;" |
|-
| style="background-color:" |
| style="text-align:left;" | Irène Zambettakis
| style="text-align:left;" | Far Left
| EXG
| 
| 0.72
| colspan="2" style="text-align:left;" |
|-
| style="background-color:" |
| style="text-align:left;" | Robert Duffau
| style="text-align:left;" | Miscellaneous Right
| DVD
| 
| 0.70
| colspan="2" style="text-align:left;" |
|-
| style="background-color:" |
| style="text-align:left;" | Maria Saez
| style="text-align:left;" | Far Left
| EXG
| 
| 0.41
| colspan="2" style="text-align:left;" |
|-
| colspan="8" style="background-color:#E9E9E9;"|
|- style="font-weight:bold"
| colspan="4" style="text-align:left;" | Total
| 
| 100%
| 
| 100%
|-
| colspan="8" style="background-color:#E9E9E9;"|
|-
| colspan="4" style="text-align:left;" | Registered voters
| 
| style="background-color:#E9E9E9;"|
| 
| style="background-color:#E9E9E9;"|
|-
| colspan="4" style="text-align:left;" | Blank/Void ballots
| 
| 1.93%
| 
| 4.23%
|-
| colspan="4" style="text-align:left;" | Turnout
| 
| 60.81%
| 
| 58.96%
|-
| colspan="4" style="text-align:left;" | Abstentions
| 
| 39.19%
| 
| 41.04%
|-
| colspan="8" style="background-color:#E9E9E9;"|
|- style="font-weight:bold"
| colspan="6" style="text-align:left;" | Result
| colspan="2" style="background-color:" | PS HOLD
|}

2007

|- style="background-color:#E9E9E9;text-align:center;"
! colspan="2" rowspan="2" style="text-align:left;" | Candidate
! rowspan="2" colspan="2" style="text-align:left;" | Party
! colspan="2" | 1st round
! colspan="2" | 2nd round
|- style="background-color:#E9E9E9;text-align:center;"
! width="75" | Votes
! width="30" | %
! width="75" | Votes
! width="30" | %
|-
| style="background-color:" |
| style="text-align:left;" | Pierre Forgues
| style="text-align:left;" | Socialist Party
| PS
| 
| 37.59
| 
| 60.77
|-
| style="background-color:" |
| style="text-align:left;" | Monique Lamon
| style="text-align:left;" | Union for a Popular Movement
| UMP
| 
| 24.33
| 
| 39.23
|-
| style="background-color:" |
| style="text-align:left;" | Rolland Castells
| style="text-align:left;" | UDF-Democratic Movement
| UDF-MoDem
| 
| 15.29
| colspan="2" style="text-align:left;" |
|-
| style="background-color:" |
| style="text-align:left;" | Louis Lages
| style="text-align:left;" | Miscellaneous Left
| DVG
| 
| 5.36
| colspan="2" style="text-align:left;" |
|-
| style="background-color:" |
| style="text-align:left;" | Erick Barrouquere-Theil
| style="text-align:left;" | Communist Party
| PCF
| 
| 5.31
| colspan="2" style="text-align:left;" |
|-
| style="background-color:" |
| style="text-align:left;" | Christiane Alias
| style="text-align:left;" | Far Left
| EXG
| 
| 3.30
| colspan="2" style="text-align:left;" |
|-
| style="background-color:" |
| style="text-align:left;" | Cathy Chateau
| style="text-align:left;" | The Greens
| LV
| 
| 2.65
| colspan="2" style="text-align:left;" |
|-
| style="background-color:" |
| style="text-align:left;" | Christiane Fourcade
| style="text-align:left;" | National Front
| FN
| 
| 2.33
| colspan="2" style="text-align:left;" |
|-
| style="background-color:" |
| style="text-align:left;" | Thierry Delattre
| style="text-align:left;" | Ecologist
| ECO
| 
| 1.07
| colspan="2" style="text-align:left;" |
|-
| style="background-color:" |
| style="text-align:left;" | Sandrine Raffel
| style="text-align:left;" | Independent
| DIV
| 
| 0.96
| colspan="2" style="text-align:left;" |
|-
| style="background-color:" |
| style="text-align:left;" | Claire Cheminade
| style="text-align:left;" | Presidential Majority
| MP
| 
| 0.68
| colspan="2" style="text-align:left;" |
|-
| style="background-color:" |
| style="text-align:left;" | Maria Saez
| style="text-align:left;" | Far Left
| EXG
| 
| 0.63
| colspan="2" style="text-align:left;" |
|-
| style="background-color:" |
| style="text-align:left;" | Louise Garnier
| style="text-align:left;" | Far Right
| EXD
| 
| 0.48
| colspan="2" style="text-align:left;" |
|-
| colspan="8" style="background-color:#E9E9E9;"|
|- style="font-weight:bold"
| colspan="4" style="text-align:left;" | Total
| 
| 100%
| 
| 100%
|-
| colspan="8" style="background-color:#E9E9E9;"|
|-
| colspan="4" style="text-align:left;" | Registered voters
| 
| style="background-color:#E9E9E9;"|
| 
| style="background-color:#E9E9E9;"|
|-
| colspan="4" style="text-align:left;" | Blank/Void ballots
| 
| 2.86%
| 
| 5.26%
|-
| colspan="4" style="text-align:left;" | Turnout
| 
| 64.33%
| 
| 64.91%
|-
| colspan="4" style="text-align:left;" | Abstentions
| 
| 35.67%
| 
| 35.09%
|-
| colspan="8" style="background-color:#E9E9E9;"|
|- style="font-weight:bold"
| colspan="6" style="text-align:left;" | Result
| colspan="2" style="background-color:" | PS HOLD
|}

2002

|- style="background-color:#E9E9E9;text-align:center;"
! colspan="2" rowspan="2" style="text-align:left;" | Candidate
! rowspan="2" colspan="2" style="text-align:left;" | Party
! colspan="2" | 1st round
! colspan="2" | 2nd round
|- style="background-color:#E9E9E9;text-align:center;"
! width="75" | Votes
! width="30" | %
! width="75" | Votes
! width="30" | %
|-
| style="background-color:" |
| style="text-align:left;" | Pierre Forgues
| style="text-align:left;" | Socialist Party
| PS
| 
| 41.22
| 
| 57.62
|-
| style="background-color:" |
| style="text-align:left;" | Patrick Butor
| style="text-align:left;" | Union for a Presidential Majority
| UMP
| 
| 29.35
| 
| 42.38
|-
| style="background-color:" |
| style="text-align:left;" | Christiane Fourcade
| style="text-align:left;" | National Front
| FN
| 
| 6.57
| colspan="2" style="text-align:left;" |
|-
| style="background-color:" |
| style="text-align:left;" | Bernard Dupin
| style="text-align:left;" | Hunting, Fishing, Nature and Traditions
| CPNT
| 
| 6.10
| colspan="2" style="text-align:left;" |
|-
| style="background-color:" |
| style="text-align:left;" | Michel Cassagne
| style="text-align:left;" | Communist Party
| PCF
| 
| 5.90
| colspan="2" style="text-align:left;" |
|-
| style="background-color:" |
| style="text-align:left;" | Sandra Ipas
| style="text-align:left;" | Revolutionary Communist League
| LCR
| 
| 2.67
| colspan="2" style="text-align:left;" |
|-
| style="background-color:" |
| style="text-align:left;" | Olivier Clement Bollee
| style="text-align:left;" | The Greens
| LV
| 
| 2.17
| colspan="2" style="text-align:left;" |
|-
| style="background-color:" |
| style="text-align:left;" | Thierry Delattre
| style="text-align:left;" | Ecologist
| ECO
| 
| 1.19
| colspan="2" style="text-align:left;" |
|-
| style="background-color:" |
| style="text-align:left;" | Andree Chenuaud
| style="text-align:left;" | Movement for France
| MPF
| 
| 1.14
| colspan="2" style="text-align:left;" |
|-
| style="background-color:" |
| style="text-align:left;" | Maria Saez
| style="text-align:left;" | Workers’ Struggle
| LO
| 
| 1.05
| colspan="2" style="text-align:left;" |
|-
| style="background-color:" |
| style="text-align:left;" | J. Marie Barrere
| style="text-align:left;" | National Republican Movement
| MNR
| 
| 0.92
| colspan="2" style="text-align:left;" |
|-
| style="background-color:" |
| style="text-align:left;" | M. Pierre Dufetelle
| style="text-align:left;" | Ecologist
| ECO
| 
| 0.58
| colspan="2" style="text-align:left;" |
|-
| style="background-color:" |
| style="text-align:left;" | Roland Laporte
| style="text-align:left;" | Independent
| DIV
| 
| 0.57
| colspan="2" style="text-align:left;" |
|-
| style="background-color:" |
| style="text-align:left;" | J. Claude Duvois
| style="text-align:left;" | Independent
| DIV
| 
| 0.45
| colspan="2" style="text-align:left;" |
|-
| style="background-color:" |
| style="text-align:left;" | Patricia Cazeaux
| style="text-align:left;" | Independent
| DIV
| 
| 0.13
| colspan="2" style="text-align:left;" |
|-
| colspan="8" style="background-color:#E9E9E9;"|
|- style="font-weight:bold"
| colspan="4" style="text-align:left;" | Total
| 
| 100%
| 
| 100%
|-
| colspan="8" style="background-color:#E9E9E9;"|
|-
| colspan="4" style="text-align:left;" | Registered voters
| 
| style="background-color:#E9E9E9;"|
| 
| style="background-color:#E9E9E9;"|
|-
| colspan="4" style="text-align:left;" | Blank/Void ballots
| 
| 3.53%
| 
| 5.60%
|-
| colspan="4" style="text-align:left;" | Turnout
| 
| 67.17%
| 
| 65.02%
|-
| colspan="4" style="text-align:left;" | Abstentions
| 
| 32.83%
| 
| 34.98%
|-
| colspan="8" style="background-color:#E9E9E9;"|
|- style="font-weight:bold"
| colspan="6" style="text-align:left;" | Result
| colspan="2" style="background-color:" | PS HOLD
|}

References

1